Cyril Patrick William Francis Radclyffe Dugmore (20 May 1882 – 22 January 1966) was a British Army officer and track and field athlete who competed in the 1908 Summer Olympics. Dugmore was born in Birr and died on Guernsey. He was a grandson of William Brougham, 2nd Baron Brougham and Vaux, and a brother of artist-author Arthur Radclyffe Dugmore.

He was commissioned a second lieutenant in the Army Service Corps on 16 August 1902, and was stationed in South Africa. He fought in the Second Boer War and the First World War.

In 1908 he finished eleventh in the triple jump event.

He was married to New York socialite Lilla Gilbert (nee Brokaw), the widow of H. Bramhall Gilbert, in January 1914. They divorced in 1923.

References

External links
Cyril Dugmore SR Olympics profile

1882 births
1966 deaths
British male triple jumpers
Olympic athletes of Great Britain
Athletes (track and field) at the 1908 Summer Olympics
Royal Army Service Corps officers
British Army personnel of the Second Boer War
British Army personnel of World War I